The first five boats in each event qualified from the 2010 Pan American Championship in Mexico City. This gave a total of 110 out of the 130 athlete quotas used. Out of the remaining 20 spots 10 will go to countries not already qualified and the remaining 10 spots will be determined by the Pan American Canoe Federation. Out of the remaining spots, some will be awarded to Mexico if it has not qualified a boat through the Pan American Championship, therefore reducing the remaining number. An NOC can enter a maximum of 16 athletes (10 men and 6 women).

Participating nations

Men

K1 200m

K2 200m

K1 1000m

K2 1000m

K4 1000m

C1 200m

C1 1000m

C2 1000m

Women
K1 200m

K1 500m

K2 500m

K4 500m

References

Qualification for the 2011 Pan American Games
Canoeing at the 2011 Pan American Games